Ras-related protein Rab-8B is a protein that in humans is encoded by the RAB8B gene.

References

Further reading